$ell.Out is the second album by the American heavy metal band Pist.On, recorded and released after the band was dropped by Atlantic Records.

Name change 
Having changed their name from Pist.On to Piston upon being signed by Atlantic Records (reportedly at the behest of the new label), the band changed their name "back" to Pist.On after being dropped by Atlantic.

Track listing 
All tracks by Henry Font except where noted.
 "Suddenly Sober" – 3:24
 "Rest" (Font, Gans) – 4:24
 "31 Degrees" – 4:46
 "When I Go" – 3:36
 "Low" – 3:46
 "Someone" – 4:10
 "C" (Font, Gans) – 5:02
 "Need to Know" – 4:41
 "New Car" – 4:24
 "Square" – 5:22
 "Waiting to Die" – 4:17

Personnel 
 Val Ium – "pills thrills n bills" (bass & vocals)
 Jeff McManus – "booze broads n bingo" (drums)
 Henry Font – "sushi sex n satan" (vocals & rhythm guitar)
 Burton Gans –  "money misery n masturbation" (rhythm & lead guitars)
Recorded at Baby Monster Studios and Spa Recording NYC
Produced by Daniel Rey
Engineered by Jon Marshall Smith
Mastered by Roger Lian at Masterdisk NYC

References 

1999 albums
Albums produced by Daniel Rey
Pist.On albums